Hale County High School is a public high school in Moundville, Alabama and serves about 360 students in Hale County, Alabama. The student body is predominantly African American and white. Wildcats are the school mascot. Black and gold are the school colors.

Its football team was established in 1913. In 2016 the school's softball team won its third straight 3A state championship. In 2017 the basketball team won its first state championship. Herbert Jones, who played for the University of Alabama, was part of the team.

References

External links

Education in Hale County, Alabama